Aminopeptidase S (Mername-AA022 peptidase, SGAP, aminopeptidase (Streptomyces griseus), Streptomyces griseus aminopeptidase, S. griseus AP, double-zinc aminopeptidase) is an enzyme. This enzyme catalyses the following chemical reaction

 Release of an N-terminal amino acid with a preference for large hydrophobic amino-terminus residues

This enzyme contains two zinc molecules in its active site and is activated by Ca2+.

References

External links 
 

EC 3.4.11